Chilotherium is an extinct genus of rhinoceros endemic to Eurasia during the Miocene through Pliocene living for 13.7—3.4 mya, existing for approximately .

Description
It was a large, robust animal reaching 1.5-1.8 m in height and a weight between 1 and 2.5 tons, depending on the species.

Both sexes are hornless. The lower jaw has a widened symphysial part and large tusk-like second incisors separated by a broad diastema. The limbs are very short and the body stout; the feet are tridactyl with diverging metapodials.
Studying C. wimani,  found a significant sexual dimorphism in the tusks and mandible, most notably the length of the tusks in males.

 argued that some features in Chilotherium, such as second incisors, mandible, cheek-teeth and other cranial features, are plesiomorphic, while some features in the tusks are apomorphic: the dorsal surface of the tusks in primitive species is turned latero-dorsally in more derived species while the medial edge has become very sharp and sickle-like and rotated dorsally, and thus a more effective cutting tool.

Chilotherium were a group of grazing animals that radiated into several subgenera and species.  Their feet were tridactyl and their legs shorter than in related groups.  A few of them remained browsers, but most of them were adapted to a grass-based diet, hence the short legs.  Their heads were horn-less but equipped with tusk-like lower incisors and were held in a horizontal position, in contrast to modern rhinos.  They inhabited the so-called sub-Paratethyan or Greek-Iranian province during the late Miocene when this region was invaded by advanced rhinos from Africa, such as Ceratotherium (modern white rhinos).  Like them, Chilotherium gradually evolved into specialised grazers, including hypsodont teeth and shortened metapodials.

Taxonomy
 

It was assigned to Rhinocerotidae by Carroll (1988); to Aceratheriini by Antoine and Saraç (2005); and to Chilotheriini by Deng (2005).

Species
Twelve species of Chilotherium have been described and 19 other species have been assigned the genus.  Nine are considered valid: four from Europe, one from Iran, and four from China.

Aprotodon differs from Chilotherium in its proportionally larger and wider symphysis; the horizontal mandibular ramus is curved both in side view and in dorsal view, unlike most rhinocerotids; and the premolars are semi-molariform, unlike the fully molariform premolars in Chilotherium.  In Subchilotherium the mandibular symphysis is much more narrow than in Chilotherium.  Acerorhinus has a strongly constricted nasal base and a mandibular symphysis that is narrow compared to that in Chilotherium.

Pathology 
A female Chilotherium skull bears the distinctive bite marks of Dinocrocuta gigantea on the forehead. Based on the regrowth of bone around the injury, the rhinoceros escaped the predator's attack and later recovered.

Notes

References

 
 
 
 
 
 
 

Miocene rhinoceroses
Pliocene extinctions
Prehistoric mammals of Asia
Prehistoric mammals of Europe
Pliocene rhinoceroses
Fossil taxa described in 1924